The Red Hose 5 Mile Race is a cross country race that is held annually in Carnwath, South Lanarkshire in Scotland.

Held annually since 1508, the Red Hose is considered the oldest foot race in the world.  The race has been held every year except during the 1926 United Kingdom general strike, the Foot and Mouth disease outbreaks in 1952 2001 and World War I and World War II. 

The requirement to hold the Red Hose is stipulated in a royal charter. If the local laird wishes to cancel it, he must get the permission of the Lord Chamberlain. 

The first prize is a pair of red hose, provided by the laird.

Reference List 

Annual sporting events in the United Kingdom
1508 establishments